Lenzburg is a village in St. Clair County, Illinois, USA. The population was 521 at the 2010 census.

Geography

Demographics

As of the census of 2000, there were 577 people, 217 households, and 169 families residing in the village. The racial makeup of the village was 99.13% White, 0.17% Native American, 0.17% Asian, and 0.52% from two or more races. Hispanic or Latino of any race were 0.69% of the population.

There were 217 households, out of which 36.4% had children under the age of 18 living with them, 53.5% were married couples living together, 18.4% had a female householder with no husband present, and 21.7% were non-families. 17.5% of all households were made up of individuals, and 8.3% had someone living alone who was 65 years of age or older. The average household size was 2.66 and the average family size was 2.91.

In the village, the population was spread out, with 29.8% under the age of 18, 8.3% from 18 to 24, 30.2% from 25 to 44, 18.9% from 45 to 64, and 12.8% who were 65 years of age or older. The median age was 35 years. For every 100 females, there were 98.3 males. For every 100 females age 18 and over, there were 95.7 males.

The median income for a household in the village was $30,417, and the median income for a family was $35,769. Males had a median income of $29,844 versus $21,023 for females. The per capita income for the village was $13,505. About 14.5% of families and 12.7% of the population were below the poverty line, including 12.3% of those under age 18 and 8.3% of those age 65 or over.

Notable people

 Warren Hacker, pitcher mostly for the Chicago Cubs and was a resident of Lenzburg at the time of his death.
 Mickey Haefner, pitcher for the Washington Senators, Chicago White Sox and Boston Braves

References

Villages in St. Clair County, Illinois
Villages in Illinois